The 1871 Ruang eruption began on March 3, and ended on March 14 at the Ruang volcano in the Molucca Sea, Indonesia. The eruption triggered a locally devastating tsunami measuring 25 meters. It flooded many villages on nearby islands, killing some 400 people.

Eruption
The eruption on March 3 began when volcanic materials began falling from the summit and into the sea. German zoologist and anthropologist Dr. Adolf Bernhard Meyer, an eyewitness to the eruption described Ruang as a conical island rising above the sea. At the time of the eruption, the island was uninhabited. The residents of nearby Tagulandang island however, owned plantations on Ruang island. A strong earthquake and loud rumbling sound occurred at 20:00 local time. Based on examining historical observations of the eruption, Pranantyo and others interpreted it as the partial collapse of the eastern volcanic flank. Simulation of a flank collapse and the triggered tsunami indicate the volume of the slide at 0.1 km3 best fit the historical descriptions of the tsunami heights on nearby islands. The Global Volcanism Program at the Smithsonian Institution assigned the eruption Level 2 on the Volcanic Explosivity Index (VEI). Eruptions continued on March 9–10 and 14.

Tsunami
According to Dr. Meyer, the tsunami caused extreme devastation on Tagulandang island, located next to Ruang, very few homes survived the tsunami. Waves of up to 25 meters swept into the seaside settlements, and inundated 180 meters inland. Two additional tsunami waves struck the coast shortly after. The tsunami destroyed the village of Bahhuas; at least 75 homes were destroyed. Three homes remained at the coast but only one was safe for use; the two other homes suffered major damage. Many homes were overturned or obliterated. A church on the island with thick exterior walls was also demolished. Debris of homes were deposited all over the former settlement.

See also 
1741 eruption of Oshima–Ōshima and the Kampo tsunami
1888 Ritter Island eruption and tsunami
2018 Sunda Strait tsunami
2022 Hunga Tonga–Hunga Ha'apai eruption and tsunami
List of tsunamis
List of volcanic eruptions by death toll

References 

1871 disasters in Asia
Tsunamis in Indonesia
19th-century volcanic events
VEI-2 eruptions
1871 tsunamis
Volcanic tsunamis
1871 natural disasters
1871 in the Dutch East Indies
Sangihe Islands
Geography of North Sulawesi